Plocamopherus apheles is a species of sea slug, a nudibranch, a shell-less marine gastropod mollusk in the family Polyceridae.

Distribution 
This species was described from East London, South Africa.

References

Barnard, K.H. 1927. South African nudibranch Mollusca, with descriptions of new species, and a note on some specimens from Tristan d’Acunha. Annals of the South African Museum 25:171–215, pls. 119–120.

Polyceridae
Gastropods described in 1927